Matai Leuta (born July 20, 1990) is an American rugby union player who plays for the United States national rugby sevens team.

Leuta became serious in 2013 about pursuing rugby professionally, and improved his diet and fitness. Before joining the U.S. national team, Leuta was studying at Monterey Peninsula College and playing amateur club rugby. Leuta was discovered in early 2015 at a recruitment camp at the Olympic Training Center in San Diego, California. Leuta joined the U.S. national rugby sevens team in 2015.

Leuta scored his first World Series try at the 2015 Japan Sevens against Portugal, when he caught the ball from the U.S. own kickoff and broke through two tacklers to score. Leuta was a member of the U.S. team at the 2015 London Sevens, where the U.S. secured its first ever tournament victory in the World Rugby Sevens Series; Leuta was a starter for the final of that tournament, helping the U.S. defeat Australia 45-22 to win the tournament.

References

External links
  Matai Leuta first international try: U.S. vs Portugal at 2015 Japan Sevens

American rugby union players
1990 births
Living people
Monterey Peninsula College alumni
United States international rugby union players
Rugby sevens players at the 2020 Summer Olympics
Olympic rugby sevens players of the United States
Rugby union centres
Rugby union wings
Houston SaberCats players